Roger Martínez Santamaría (born 5 April 2004) is a professional footballer who plays as a midfielder for RCD Espanyol.

Club career
Born in Badalona, Barcelona, Catalonia, Martínez represented UE Cornellà and FC Barcelona before joining RCD Espanyol's youth categories in 2016. He made his senior debut with the reserves at the age of 16 on 15 November 2020, coming on as a late substitute for Iván Gil in a 3–1 Segunda División B home loss against Lleida Esportiu.

Martínez scored his first senior goal on 16 April 2022, netting the B's second in a 2–1 home win over Terrassa FC. He made his first team debut on 3 January of the following year, starting in a 3–1 home success over RC Celta de Vigo, for the season's Copa del Rey.

Martínez made his La Liga debut on 7 January 2023, replacing Brian Oliván late into a 2–2 home draw against Girona FC.

References

External links
 
 

2004 births
Living people
People from Badalona
Footballers from Catalonia
Spanish footballers
Association football midfielders
La Liga players
Segunda División B players
Segunda Federación players
RCD Espanyol B footballers
RCD Espanyol footballers
Spain youth international footballers
Sportspeople from the Province of Barcelona